The Ronnie Van Zant Memorial Park is a public memorial park located in Lake Asbury, Clay County, Florida. The park was built in memory of Ronnie Van Zant, vocalist of Southern rock group Lynyrd Skynyrd, who died along with numerous other band members and crew in a 1977 plane crash. The park was funded by fans and family of the band, and features a number of facilities including tennis courts, fishing ponds, a disc golf course and picnic areas, among other amenities.

References

Sources
Official website
Clay County Parks Website

Lynyrd Skynyrd
Monuments and memorials in Florida
Parks in Florida
Parks in Jacksonville, Florida
1996 establishments in Florida
Protected areas established in 1996